Grivel is a French surname. Notable people with the surname include:

 Guillaume Grivel (1735– 1810), French writer, legislator  and educator
 Jean Grivel, (1560—1624), jurist from Franche-Comté
 Jean-Baptiste Grivel (1778 – 1869), rear admiral in the French Navy and naval writer
 Louis Grivel (1901 –1969), Swiss writer
 Philippe Grivel (born 1964), Swiss former cyclist

See also 

 Grivel

French-language surnames